The Asianet Television Awards (ATA) is one of Asianet's newer ventures. It is a promotional platform of Asianet's TV shows. Since TV actors and actress' lack a strong society like Association of Malayalam Movie Artists, Asianet conducts functions to token their actors, directors, producers and production houses alternatively.

The awards ceremony was co-sponsored by Lux in the year 2005 which was titled as Asianet Kudumbam awards later Confident Group took up the sponsorship in the next 2 years. Then Ayu:Care, Nirapara, Doublehourse were the title sponsors. The function is normally held in Kozhikode, Palakkad, Kottayam, Angamaly and Thiruvananthapuram cities in Kerala. It was also held thrice in Al Saj Convention centre Trivandrum.

Serials with most awards
Swapnam (2005), Sthree2 (2006), Ente Manasaputhri (2008), Autograph (2011) Kumkumapoovu (2012) Kumkumapoovu (2013), Parasparam (2014), Parasparam (2015), Parasparam (2016), Vanambadi (2017), Kasthooriman (2018), Vanambadi (2019)

Awards for Serial

Best Serial

Most Popular Serial

Awards for Actors/Actresses

Best Actress 
The Asianet Television Award for Best Female Actor has been awarded since 2005.

Best Actor 
The Asianet Television Award for Best Male Actor has been awarded since 2005.

Best Popular Actress 
The Asianet Television Award for Best Actress (Popular) has been awarded since 2011.

Best Popular Actor
The Asianet Television Award for Best Actor (Popular) has been awarded since 2008.

Best Character Actress
The Asianet Television Award for Best Actress (Character) has been awarded since 2005.

Best Character Actor
The Asianet Television Award for Best Actor (Character) has been awarded since 2005.

Best Star Pair
The Asianet Television Award for Best Star Pair has been awarded since 2011 later discontinued and reintroduced in 2016.

Best New Face
The Asianet Television Award for Best New Face (Male/Female) has been awarded since 2011.

Best Performance in a Negative Role 
The Asianet Television Award for Best Negative Role has been awarded since 2005.

Best Performance in a Comical Role
The Asianet Television Award for Best Comedian (Male/Female) has been awarded since 2011.

Best Child Artist
The Asianet Television Award for Best Child Artist (Male/Female) has been awarded since 2005.

Life Time Achievement Award
The Asianet Television Award for Lifetime Achievement has been awarded since 2012 occasionally.

Youth Icon
The Asianet Television Award for Youth Icon has been awarded since 2016.

Technical Awards

Best Director 
The Asianet Television Award for Best Director  has been awarded since 2005.

Best Screenplay
The Asianet Television Award for Best Script  has been awarded since 2005

Best Videography 
The Asianet Television Award for Best Cameraman  has been awarded since 2005 later renamed as Videography

Best Editor
The Asianet Television Award for Best Editor  has been awarded since 2011.

Best Audiography
The Asianet Television Award for Best Sound Recordist  has been awarded since 2011 and later renamed as Audiography.

Best Dubbing Artist (Male)
The Asianet Television Award for Best Dubbing  has been awarded since 2013.

Best Dubbing Artist (Female)
The Asianet Television Award for Best Dubbing  has been awarded since 2012.

Awards for Music

Best Music Director 
The Asianet Film Award for Best Music Director has been awarded since 2011 occasionally.

Best Lyricist 
The Asianet Television Award for Best Music Director has been awarded since 2011 occasionally

Best Playback Singer 
The Asianet Television Award for Best Singer has been awarded since 2008 occasionally

References 

Indian television awards